Quintin "Q" Dailey (January 22, 1961 – November 8, 2010) was an American professional basketball player. A 6'3" guard who played collegiately at the University of San Francisco, he later went on to a career in the NBA, playing for the Chicago Bulls, Los Angeles Clippers, and Seattle SuperSonics over the course of his 10-year tenure in the league.

Early life and legal troubles
Dailey was born on January 22, 1961, in Baltimore and was a schoolboy star at Cardinal Gibbons School, graduating in 1979. Heavily recruited out of high school, Dailey chose to attend the University of San Francisco from among the 200 colleges that pursued him and play for the school's basketball team. Dailey scored 1,841 points during his collegiate career, averaging 20.5 points per game. The 755 points he scored during his third and final year at USF, averaging 25.2 points per game, broke the team record that had been held by Bill Cartwright.

In February 1982, Dailey was arrested for sexually assaulting a female resident assistant two months earlier.  He pleaded guilty in June to a lesser charge of attempted assault, receiving three years' probation.  During the investigation, Dailey admitted to accepting $5,000 for a no-show job at a business owned by a prominent USF non-sports donor.  A month later, university president the Rev. John Lo Schiavo announced that he was shutting down the basketball program.  USF had been on NCAA probation twice in recent years, and LoSchiavo called the revelation about Dailey's no-show job "the last straw."  The program wouldn't return until 1985.  Four days after his guilty plea, the Bulls selected Dailey as the seventh overall pick in the 1982 NBA draft.

Playing career
The controversy followed him to Chicago. Women's groups and the Chicago press protested against his presence on the team, and building owners refused to have him as a tenant. John Schulian of the Chicago Sun-Times criticized the preferential treatment he had received as a star basketball player, saying that "if he were just another creep off the street, he would still be learning what a chamber of horrors the halls of justice can be."  At his first press conference after being drafted, he refused to express any remorse for the victim and claimed no one gave him a chance to tell his side of the story.  The student sued him in 1983, and Dailey settled by paying $100,000 and apologizing to her.

Despite the off-court distractions, Dailey averaged 15.1 points per game in his first season with the Bulls and was chosen for that year's NBA All-Rookie Team.  The following year was his most productive, when he averaged 18.2 points for the Bulls.  In 1985, Dailey carped that rookie Michael Jordan received more attention from the team, arguing that he was "a player who likes to shine a little bit myself".

On March 20, 1985, in a game where the Bulls visited San Antonio, Dailey, going against usual NBA decorum, had a ballboy bring him food during the game. As the third quarter drew to a close, Dailey was on the bench eating a slice of pizza, nachos, popcorn and a soft drink.

Over his ten years in the NBA he averaged 14.1 points per game but continued to be a distraction off the court, missing games and violating the NBA drug policy on two occasions.

Post playing career

In 1996, he was hired by the Clark County Parks and Recreation Department. He eventually became a recreation and cultural program supervisor, a position he maintained until his death. Dailey had a variety of responsibilities, including gang intervention, sports and special events.

He also returned in basketball, working as a referee starting in 2000 and continuing until 2010.

Dailey died in his sleep in Las Vegas at the age of 49 on November 8, 2010, due to hypertensive cardiovascular disease. He was survived by a daughter and a son.

References

 

1961 births
2010 deaths
20th-century African-American sportspeople
21st-century African-American people
African-American basketball players
All-American college men's basketball players
American men's basketball players
Basketball players from Baltimore
Chicago Bulls draft picks
Chicago Bulls players
Jacksonville Jets (CBA) players
Los Angeles Clippers players
McDonald's High School All-Americans
Mississippi Jets players
Parade High School All-Americans (boys' basketball)
San Francisco Dons men's basketball players
Seattle SuperSonics players
Shooting guards
Sioux Falls Skyforce (CBA) players
Yakima Sun Kings players